Larry Hicks is a Republican member of the Wyoming Senate, representing the 11th district  since 2011. The 11th district includes Albany and Carbon Counties.

References

|-

1958 births
21st-century American politicians
Living people
Montana State University alumni
People from Carbon County, Wyoming
Republican Party Wyoming state senators